Ireneo "Rene" Barrientos (born July 25, 1943) is a Filipino former professional boxer. He competed from 1962 to 1978 and held the WBC super-featherweight title in 1969.

Early life
Ireneo "Rene" Barrientos was born on July 25, 1943, in Balete, Aklan, the fourth of 10 children whose father was a policeman. Their father died when Barrientos was 12 years old. At a tender age of 15, he joined his brothers working in the farm in Cotabato.

Like most boxers, Barrientos dropped out of school at age 17 due to poverty and worked as a mechanic's helper in a logging firm. He was promoted to the position of foreman when the company transferred its concession to Samar.

Professional career
Upon his return to Cotabato, Barrientos saw upon Gabriel “Flash” Elorde's world title fight against Harold Gomes at a movie house and was fascinated by the sport of prizefighting especially that Elorde became world champion that time. He turned pro on October 2, 1962, knocking out Charlie Kid in the second round. He transferred to Cagayan de Oro and on February 27, 1965, he faced his idol Flash Elorde in a 12-round match for the Orient Pacific Boxing Federation lightweight title at the Cebu Coliseum. Elorde was already the world super featherweight champion that time but his world title belt was not at stake. Barrientos fought Elorde with a tough fight for 12 rounds, but he lost a unanimous decision. But after the match Elorde commented that Barrientos will become a future champion. Barrientos went on to win over Carl Peñalosa, the father of world champions Gerry and Dodie Boy Peñalosa, twice. In the first encounter, Barrientos won by 4th-round TKO. During the rematch, he won by unanimous decision. Both fights were held at the Cebu Coliseum. After 11 straight victories following the match with Elorde, he lost a decision then draw the rematch in succession with future junior welterweight champion Pedro Adigue Jr. on January 21 then on February 17 of 1967.

On April 29, 1967, he won the Philippine super featherweight title via points decision over Raymond Rivera in a fight held in Davao City.

He battled WBC/WBA super featherweight/junior lightweight champion Hiroshi Kobayashi on March 30, 1968, in Tokyo, Japan. The fight ended in a controversial majority draw with the judge and referee from Japan scoring it a draw, while the Filipino judge saw it in favor of Barrientos. The WBC ordered an immediate rematch, which Kobayashi refused, prompting the WBC to strip the Japanese of his title and ordered the number one contender Barrientos to face the number two contender Ruben Navarro of Los Angeles, California.

Barrientos defeated Navarro by unanimous decision at the Araneta Coliseum on February 15, 1969. It was reported that Barrientos vomited an hour before the fight time, but pummeled his opponent badly to win convincingly. Barrientos’ reign as world champion lasted only more than a year as he lost a controversial split-decision to Japan's Yoshiaki Numata in Tokyo, Japan on January 3, 1971.

He retired after his majority decision win over Javier Ayala in Hawaii on July 25, 1972, after injuring his left hand. But he returned to the ring in 1978 for two more victories in fights against Filipino Joe Faune by 2nd-round KO and Thai Jong Satherigym by decision.

At present, Barrientos trains boxers in Cagayan de Oro City under the patronage of Mayor Oscar Moreno.

Professional boxing record

See also

List of world super-featherweight boxing champions
List of Filipino boxing world champions

References

External links

 

|-

1943 births
Living people
Filipino male boxers
Sportspeople from Aklan
Super-featherweight boxers
Lightweight boxers
World super-featherweight boxing champions
World Boxing Council champions